Avik Roy (Bengali: অভীক রায়) is an American conservative commentator and activist.

Education and early career 

Roy was born in Rochester, Michigan, to Indian immigrant parents, and attended high school in Beverly Hills, Michigan and San Antonio, Texas. In his senior year he was named a first team member of the 1990 USA Today All-USA High School Academic Team, awarded to the twenty best performing academic students in the country. In his college years, Roy studied molecular biology at the Massachusetts Institute of Technology. In 1993, during Roy's term as a writer for the MIT student publication Counterpoint, he was unsuccessfully sued for defamation by Trinidadian Africana studies professor Tony Martin, after publishing an article detailing past controversies surrounding Martin. Roy then attended the Yale School of Medicine. Roy was active politically at Yale, where he served as the chairman for the Conservative Party of the Yale Political Union.

Between 2001 and 2004, Roy worked as an analyst and portfolio manager at investment firm Bain Capital, later working in a similar position for JPMorgan Chase, which he left to found a healthcare-focused hedge fund. In 2009, Roy was working as the managing partner at the New York-based hedge fund Mymensingh Partners, later working for the securities firm Monness, Crespi, Hardt & Co., Inc. In early 2012, Roy founded Roy Healthcare Research, an investment research firm located in New York.

Commentary and activism

In March 2009, Roy began writing The Apothecary, a personal blog focusing on healthcare policy, particularly his opposition to the Patient Protection and Affordable Care Act. He was able to devote more time to the blog from 2010 onward, reaching a wider audience in 2010 when National Review Online featured his posts as a part of their health-care focused blog, Critical Condition, and their policy-focused blog, The Agenda, where he worked with Reihan Salam and Josh Barro. In February 2011, Roy's blog was officially picked up by Forbes as an integrated blog featured on their website. In January 2014, Roy was appointed the opinion editor for Forbes.

Roy became a senior fellow at the Manhattan Institute in 2011. In 2013 Roy published the book How Medicaid Fails the Poor, a work arguing that Medicaid produces poor health outcomes and limited access to physician care. In 2014, he authored a proposal for health care reform through the Manhattan Institute, entitled Transcending Obamacare: A Patient-Centered Plan for Near-Universal Coverage and Permanent Fiscal Solvency. This was elaborated on in his third publication, The Case Against Obamacare (2014).

In 2016, Roy co-founded the Foundation for Research on Equal Opportunity, a think tank. Roy has written for Forbes, National Review, and other outlets. He has appeared on TV such as Fox News, Fox Business, MSNBC, CNBC and Bloomberg Television. He has appeared on PBS's Newshour and on HBO's Real Time With Bill Maher.

Republican advisor 
In 2012, Roy was health care policy advisor to the Mitt Romney presidential campaign. In the 2016 Republican primary, Roy was initially senior advisor to former Texas governor Rick Perry's 2016 presidential campaign. In September 2015, Perry suspended his presidential campaign. Shortly thereafter, Roy joined the 2016 presidential campaign of Marco Rubio as an advisor.

Roy has been on the Board of Advisors for the National Institute for Health Care Management Foundation which he joined in 2014, and Concerned Veterans for America.

In July 2016, as quoted in a Vox article, Roy said that the Republican Party had "lost its right to govern, because it is driven by white nationalism rather than a true commitment to equality for all Americans."

References

External links
 Avik Roy's blog at Forbes
 Avik Roy's articles at National Review
 Avik Roy's YouTube page
 

American magazine editors
American bloggers
American columnists
American male journalists
Living people
Financial advisors
Massachusetts Institute of Technology School of Science alumni
Writers from Detroit
Yale School of Medicine alumni
Year of birth missing (living people)
New York (state) Republicans
American people of Bengali descent
People from Rochester, Michigan
Manhattan Institute for Policy Research
21st-century American non-fiction writers
American male bloggers